Pavol Zemanovič (born 11 March 1990 in Zlaté Moravce) is a Slovak football defender who currently plays for FC ViOn Zlaté Moravce.

FC ViOn Zlaté Moravce
He made his debut for FC ViOn Zlaté Moravce against FK Dukla Banská Bystrica on 16 May 2012.

External links
FC ViOn profile 

Eurofotbal.cz profile

References

1990 births
Living people
Slovak footballers
Association football goalkeepers
FC ViOn Zlaté Moravce players
Slovak Super Liga players
People from Zlaté Moravce
Sportspeople from the Nitra Region